Landspeed is a 2002 American sports drama film directed by Christian McIntire and starring Billy Zane and Ray Wise.

Plot
Set in 1972 in the Nevada desert, the film is about six American racing teams that are trying to surpass the 1,000 miles per hour land speed record. Landspeed stars Billy Zane and Ray Wise as a father-son duo who are attempting the feat, which comes with a $50million award. Writing in the Billings Gazette, Jay Bobbin said "that effort is fraught with tension and danger, but the men remain determined to reach their goal".

Cast
 Billy Zane as Michael Sanger
 Ray Wise as Brian Sanger
 Pamela Gidley as Linda Fincher

Reception
In a positive review of the film, May Thornton wrote in The Advertiser, "Zane quips and smirks his way through, enjoys a little subplot about childhood sweethearts, but the real stars are the cars, backed with impressive special effects. The final word: Going, going, gone in 90 minutes." VideoHound gave the film 1.5 stars and concluded "It's helpful to forget your knowledge of physics."

References

External links

2002 films
2000s sports drama films
American sports drama films
American auto racing films
2000s English-language films
2002 drama films